Francis Head may refer to:

 Sir Francis Bond Head (1793–1875), Lieutenant-Governor of Upper Canada during the rebellion of 1837
 Francis Head (cricketer) (1846–1941), English cricketer
 Sir Francis Head, 4th Baronet (1693–1768)